Lieutenant-General Sir Charles Gregan Craufurd GCB (12 February 1763 – 26 March 1821) was a British soldier.

He was born in Golden Square, London, the second son of Sir Alexander Crauford of Kilbirnie, 1st Baronet and his wife, Jane Crokatt. He was the younger brother of Sir James Craufurd of Kilbirnie, 2nd Baronet and the elder brother of Robert Craufurd.

Charles Craufurd entered the 1st Dragoon Guards as a cornet on 15 December 1778. Promoted a lieutenant in 1781, he was raised to the rank of captain in the 2nd Dragoon Guards (Queen's Bays) in 1785. He became the equerry and intimate friend of the Duke of York. He studied in Germany for some time, and, with his brother Robert's assistance, translated Tielke's book on the Seven Years' War (The Remarkable Events of the War between Prussia, Austria and Russia from 1756 to 1763). As aide-de-camp he accompanied the Duke of York to the French War on the Netherlands in May 1793 attached to the Austrian HQ's commander-in-chief. He was at once sent as commissioner to the Austrian headquarters, with which he was present at Neerwinden, Caesar's Camp, Famars, Landrecies, etc.

Promoted to major in May 1793, and lieutenant-colonel in February 1794, he returned to the British Army in the latter year to become deputy assistant adjutant-general. At the Battle of Villers-en-Cauchies he distinguished himself at the head of a charge of two squadrons, capturing three guns and taking 1,000 prisoners. When the British army left the continent, Craufurd was again attached to the Austrian Army, and was present at the actions on the Lahn, the combat of Neumarket, and the Amberg.  At the last battle a severe wound rendered him incapable of further service, and cut short a promising career.  He was invalided out to England.  There he did all he could to advance his brother, Robert's career.  Promoted colonel on 26 January 1797, he was already in charge of a brigade-major. On 23 September 1803 he was promoted to major-general.

On 7 February 1800 he was married Anna Mary, widow of Thomas Pelham-Clinton, 3rd Duke of Newcastle.  The 4th Duke was a minor.  His brother Robert got married on the same day.  Charles Craufurd was already an MP when appointed colonel of 2nd Dragoon Guards.  He was made a Lieutenant-General in 1810.  He succeeded his brother Robert as Member of Parliament (MP) for East Retford (1806–1812). He died in 1821, and made GCB on 27 May 1820. Charles Craufurd was a Tory in politics, friend of Lord Londonderry.

References

Bibliography 

1761 births
1821 deaths
British Army lieutenant generals
British Army personnel of the French Revolutionary Wars
Knights Grand Cross of the Order of the Bath
Members of the Parliament of the United Kingdom for English constituencies
UK MPs 1806–1807
UK MPs 1807–1812
1st King's Dragoon Guards officers
2nd Dragoon Guards (Queen's Bays) officers
Scottish soldiers
Younger sons of baronets